Shaw Mobile is a mobile virtual network operator (MVNO) division of Freedom Mobile, itself a subsidiary of Shaw Communications, which sells wireless services in the Canadian provinces of Alberta and British Columbia. Its launch was announced on July 30, 2020.

Shaw Mobile is an MVNO on the existing Freedom Mobile network, which has been owned by Shaw Communications since 2016. However, Shaw Mobile is positioned as being a comparable service to the flagship brands of the "big three" national mobile providers (Bell, Rogers and Telus) with offerings that can be bundled with Shaw’s home internet services, whereas Freedom's main competitors are flanker brands such as Virgin, Fido, and Koodo.

Under the proposed acquisition of Shaw Communications by Rogers Communications and resale of Freedom Mobile to Quebecor, the latter would acquire all of "Freedom's branded wireless and Internet customers"; the companies were silent as to how customers under the Shaw Mobile brand would be affected.

References

External links 
 Shaw Mobile website

Mobile phone companies of Canada
Shaw Communications
2020 establishments in Alberta